Hormographiella is a genus of fungi in the family Psathyrellaceae. The genus contains three species of anamorphic fungi that have Coprinopsis or Coprinellus teleomorphs.

References

Psathyrellaceae